Survival of the Fittest (2017) was a three-night, three-city professional wrestling event produced by the American wrestling promotion Ring of Honor, the 12th Survival of the Fittest. It took place on November 17, 2017, at the Austin Highway Event Center in San Antonio, Texas, November 18, 2017, at Gilley's Dallas in Dallas, Texas and November 19, 2017, at the Cox Convention Center in Oklahoma City, Oklahoma.

The event also was notable for actor Stephen Amell, who was previously announced as the host for the first night of the tour, joining the Bullet Club stable and wrestling in the show's main event.

Background 
Survival of The Fittest featured professional wrestling matches that involved wrestlers from pre-existing scripted feuds or storylines that played out on ROH's television program, Ring of Honor Wrestling. Wrestlers portrayed heroes (faces) or villains (heels) as they followed a series of events that built tension and culminated in a wrestling match or series of matches.

Survival of the Fittest is an annual tournament held by ROH. For the 2017 event, the winners from designated tournament matches in Night 1 at San Antonio, Texas and Night 2 at Dallas, Texas advanced to a 6-Man Elimination Match on Night 3 in Oklahoma City, Oklahoma, and the winner of that match was declared Survivor of the Fittest, and received a future ROH World Championship match.

2017 Survival of the Fittest tournament participants

 Beer City Bruiser
 Cheeseburger
 Flip Gordon
 Jay Lethal
 Jonathan Gresham
 Josh Woods
 Matt Taven
 Punishment Martinez
 Shane Taylor
 Silas Young
 T. K. O'Ryan
 Vinny Marseglia

Results

Night 1 - San Antonio, TX

Night 2 - Dallas, TX

Night 3 - Oklahoma City, OK

Order of Elimination
 Matt Taven was eliminated by Disqualification
 Shane Taylor was eliminated by Jonathan Gresham and Flip Gordon (double pin)
 Jonathan Gresham was eliminated by Punishment Martinez
 Silas Young was eliminated by Punishment Martinez
 Flip Gordon was eliminated by Punishment Martinez

References

   

2017 in professional wrestling
2017 in Texas
2017 in Oklahoma
Events in Oklahoma
Events in San Antonio
Events in Dallas
ROH Survival of the Fittest
Professional wrestling in the Dallas–Fort Worth metroplex
Professional wrestling in San Antonio
Professional wrestling in Oklahoma